Santa Clara Station may refer to:
 Santa Clara – Great America station, near the Great America amusement park in northern Santa Clara, California, United States
 Santa Clara Transit Center, in central Santa Clara, California, United States
 Santa Clara station (Metrorail), Miami, Florida, United States
 Santa Clara (São Paulo Metro), São Paulo, Brasil
 Santa Clara station (VTA), San Jose, California, United States
 Santa Clara railway station (Cuba), Santa Clara, Cuba